Highwayman 2 is the second studio album released by American country supergroup The Highwaymen. This album was released in 1990 on the Columbia Records label. Johnny Cash had left Columbia several years earlier, making this a "homecoming", and ultimately his final work for Columbia as the next Highwaymen album would be issued on another label.

Background
In the years since the first Highwaymen album, a new crop of younger stars, such as Randy Travis, Steve Earle, and Dwight Yoakam had emerged, and country radio shifted its focus accordingly.  By 1989, only Nelson remained a commercial presence, having topped the charts with "Nothing I Can Do About It Now” and scored a Top 10 hit with “There You Are.”  Cash's 1988 album, Classic Cash: Hall of Fame Series, was a collection of old hits that was lambasted for its slick 80s instrumentation, including synthesizers, and his most recent LP, Boom Chicka Boom, released around the same time as Highwaymen 2, didn't even chart.  Jennings’ previous album, 1988's Full Circle, peaked at number 37, and Kristofferson's 1986 recording, the overtly political Repossessed, also produced by Moman, stalled at number 31.  With the massive success of the first Highwaymen album, and the fading interest from country radio, it made sense for the four legends to reform for an album and tour.

Recording & tour
Chips Moman again resumed production duties for the second Highwaymen album.  Moman, who had enjoyed tremendous success recording Nelson throughout the eighties, gave the album a contemporary sound for the time, although it may not have aged well; AllMusic contends the album “suffers from an overall homogenous and dated 1980s studio sound.”  Kristofferson biographer Stephen Miller notes, “Moman produced in such a fashion – prominent drums, electric guitars, and organs – as to bring rock values to songs that, with a different approach, could just as easily have been pure country.”

"Silver Stallion" was released as the first single from the album (with an accompanying music video) and reached number 25 on the charts.  The album did better, rising to number 4, but it was not the success the first Highwaymen album was.  Unlike that LP, there were more writing contributions from the members, with Nelson and Kristofferson providing two songs, Cash offering one, and Jennings bringing in a song he co-wrote with Roger Murrah. (Kristofferson's two contributions were recycled from previous albums: “Anthem ’84” from 1986's Repossessed and “Living Legend” from 1978's Easter Island.)

The Highwaymen tour to promote the album was a success, playing to over 55,000 fans at the opening gig at the Houston Livestock Show and Rodeo, and the rest of the tour attracted near sell-out audiences despite Cash suffering from a broken jaw. There were rumours of clashing egos and flare-ups, in part fuelled by Kristofferson's penchant for sounding off on his political views and opposition to American foreign policy.  While Kristofferson was honoured to be among The Highwaymen's ranks, he didn't shy away from expressing his political views on occasion – even though this risked displeasing the audience, not to mention members of the band and crew who reputedly held up signs saying, “That doesn’t go for me.” It rankled Jennings in particular, who revealed in the A&E's Kristofferson episode of Biography, “We came very close a couple of time to punching it out. I didn’t say he was all wrong, the main thing I was sayin’ was he shouldn't’ve been doin’ it onstage, especially with three other people on there who didn't share all of his thoughts.”  In his 2015 autobiography My Life, Nelson dismisses the idea of rancour, writing “Rumours spread that Waylon, Johnny, Kris, and I were having ego problems and fighting like cats an dogs.  The rumours were bullshit.  We saw it as one nonstop transcontinental party…I don’t mean that we didn’t get a little cranky from time to time…For the most part, though, it was smooth sailing.”

Reception
Highwaymen 2 spent 40 weeks on the country chart, peaking at number 4.  AllMusic: “Country music's version of the Traveling Wilburys, the Highwaymen's second album clocks in at just under a mere 33 minutes and covers little new territory for the group of country legends. Sadly, of the ten tracks, only six were penned by any of the members…Overall, Highwayman 2 features a decent set of rather uneventful songs, but only the most dedicated fan will find this album a necessity.”

Track listing

Personnel
Willie Nelson - vocals, guitar
Johnny Cash - vocals
Waylon Jennings - vocals
Kris Kristofferson - vocals
Gene Chrisman - drums
Mike Leech - bass
Reggie Young, Johnny Christopher, Chips Moman, Shawn Lane - guitar
Bobby Emmons, Bobby Wood - keyboards
Mickey Raphael - harmonica
Robby Turner - steel guitar

Additional personnel
Produced by: Chips Moman
Recorded at Emerald Sound Studio, Nashville, TN, Three Alarm Recording Studio, Memphis, TN, and Pedernales Recording Studio, Speicewood, TX
Mixed at 3-Alarms Recording Studio, Memphis, TN
Engineers: Chips Moman and David Cherry
Assistant Engineers: David Parker, Larry Greenhill, Howard Irving, Skip McQuinn, David Edney, and Eric Paul
Additional Overdubs: Bobby Emmons, Chips Moman, Rivers Rutherford, Robbie Turner, Jack Powell, David Edney and Johnny Barringer
Mastered by: Denny Purcell of Georgetown Masters, Nashville, TN
Art Direction by: Bill Johnson and Rollow Welch
Photography by: Jim McGuire

Charts

Weekly charts

Year-end charts

Certifications

References

External links
 Willie Nelson's Official Website
 Kris Kristofferson's Official Website
 Johnny Cash's Official Website
 Waylon Jennings' Official Website

1990 albums
Columbia Records albums
Albums produced by Chips Moman
The Highwaymen (country supergroup) albums